The Abington Farm, or Abbington Manor & Farm, is a historic home and stables at Crownsville, Anne Arundel County, Maryland, United States. The main house is a -story frame, side-passage, double-pile house with additions on both gable ends. The main block dates from about 1840. On the property are several outbuildings, including a frame summer kitchen; a stone and frame ice house; a frame, brick, and stone springhouse/dairy; a frame privy, chicken house, tool shed, and corncrib; a large, elaborate frame stable; and a frame tenant house.

The Abbington Farm was listed on the National Register of Historic Places in 1984.

References

External links
, including photo from 1984, at Maryland Historical Trust

Houses on the National Register of Historic Places in Maryland
Houses in Anne Arundel County, Maryland
Houses completed in 1839
National Register of Historic Places in Anne Arundel County, Maryland